Maila Aanchal is a 1954 Hindi novel written by Phanishwar Nath Renu. After Premchand's Godan, 'Maila Anchal' is regarded as the most significant Hindi novel in the Hindi literature tradition. It is one of the greatest examples of "Anchalik Upanyas" (regional novel) in Hindi.

Significance
It was the writer's first novel and immediately established him as a serious writer in Hindi literature. It radically shifted the prevalent narrative styles in Hindi novels and changed the structure of Hindi novels. It has contributed towards the study of Hindi as a language and also constitutes the major curriculum of Hindi course.

Phanishwar Nath Renu was subsequently awarded one of India's fourth highest civilian honours, the Padma Shri.

Contents
This social novel details the trials and tribulations of a small group of people in a remote village of North-east Bihar during the Quit India Movement. It also has the reference of a young doctor (dagdar babu) who took care of the masses at that time, which was inspired by Dr. Alakh Niranjan, the first MBBS doctor in the locality.
It is a regional novel in true sense as local colour is reflected in it by means of dialect, life style, superstitions and beliefs, festivals      and culture of the rural people. The characters are fit to the region and they are guided by the regional characteristics . The region      becomes to be a living character and plays a great role in leading the characters to the catastrophe .

Adaptation 
Maila Aanchal, a television adaptation of the novel aired on DD National, the Indian national public broadcaster, during the 1990s.

References

External links
 

Hindi-language novels
Culture of Mithila
Books on Mithila Region
1954 novels
1954 Indian novels